Waverly Walter Alford III (born August 18, 1977), known professionally by his stage name King Gordy, is an American horrorcore singer/rapper from Detroit, Michigan. He is one-fourth of underground hip hop group the Fat Killahz (with Fatt Father, Marv Won and Bang Belushi), one-third of the horrorcore supergroup How to Gag a Maggot (with Jimmy Donn and GrewSum), and one-half of the hardcore rap duos Last American Rock Stars (with Bizarre of D12) and Even Heathens (with ILLtemper.) He is currently signed to Twiztid's Majik Ninja Entertainment.

Early life 
Alford was raised in Detroit, Michigan. His father worked for Chrysler and his mother worked for the school board. His parents split when he was 13. At the age of sixteen, Alford was arrested for selling drugs, and served nine months in a Wayne County jail.

Career 
He has started rapping on Detroit local underground hip hop scene in 2000 as a battle rapper. In 2001, along with Fatt Father, Marv Won and Shim-E-Bango, Gordy joined a four-piece Detroit-based underground hip hop act the Fat Killahz as the only singing emcee of the group. He signed with Bass Brothers' Web Entertainment, an independent label that released the first Eminem's full-length album, Infinite, and started work on a record.

Due to this term, Gordy has appeared in the film 8 Mile, in which he played the fictional rapper, "Big O", the character was regularly mentioned by character Wink Harris as "the fat man flipping burgers at Mickey D's". He dropped his debut solo album The Entity in 2003, which is notable also by its audio production handled by Eminem among other producers and rappers appeared on the record. In 2005, Gordy and the Fat Killahz released the group's debut Guess Who's Coming to Dinner? album via No Tyze Entertainment. Same year he made guest appearances on Bizarre's and Proof's debut albums.

From 2006 to 2009, Gordy released another five solo albums via Morbid Music LLC, which featured guest appearances only by the likes of the Fat Killahz and his childhood friend Bizarre of D12, with whom Gordy formed hip hop duo The Davidians in 2008. Gordy's second successful album Xerxes The God-King was released in 2010 and featured his second music video (since "Nightmares" from The Entity), "Sing For The Dead".

In 2011, Gordy released a Detroit blues album, King Gordy Sings the Blues, a new Fat Killahz effort The E.P., and his first extended play Jesus Christ's Mistress. The following year he nicknamed himself as Dark Lord Vader and dropped his second solo EP Hail Dark Lord Vader, which marked him his comeback into horrorcore. He has started to aggressively promote his harder image in social media, and Twitter suspended Gordy for various reasons as he mentions on the album.

After recovering from being shot five times during an alleged robbery in Detroit, King Gordy came back with Herojuana, a collaborative six-track EP with his Fat Killahz bandmate Bang Belushi, released in 2016.

In 2017, he and Bizarre got signed by Twiztid to Majik Ninja Entertainment as a hip hop duo L.A.R.S. They released their eponymous debut album on February 16, 2018. Also since 2017, Gordy and Minnesota rapper Jimmy Donn teams up for How to Gag a Maggot project, which has 1 studio album followed-up 2 EPs as of June 2020.

Confrontations 
After rapper Haystak made a diss track towards Eminem, King Gordy and Bizarre collaborated to respond with diss tracks "Hey, Haystak" and "R.I.P Haystak". Rapper Brabo Gator, who knew Haystak, then dissed King Gordy, Obie Trice, D12 and Eminem.

On June 28, 2013, King Gordy challenged the rapping ability of Lupe Fiasco and other mainstream rappers (such as Mac Miller, Yelawolf, and Tyler the Creator) on Twitter. Lupe Fiasco then continued to fuel the fire by responding to King Gordy, the back and forth continued for over eight hours and both rappers explicitly expressed their respect for each other's craft, but insisted they would beat each other in a rap battle.

In late 2014, Gordy released a song titled "Return Of The King", which is a diss track towards other rappers such as Lo Key and Tyler the Creator.

Discography

Studio albums 
2003: The Entity
2006: King of Horrorcore
2007: Van Dyke and Harper Music
2007: Cobain's Diary
2008: The Great American Weed Smoker
2009: King of Horrorcore 2
2010: Xerxes The God-King
2011: King Gordy Sings the Blues
TBR: Anakin

Collaborative albums 
2005: Guess Who's Coming to Dinner? (as Fat Killahz)
2017: How to Gag a Maggot (as How to Gag a Maggot)
2018: Last American Rock Stars (as L.A.R.S.)
2020: The House LP (as How to Gag a Maggot)
2021: II: Goat (as How to Gag a Maggot)
2021: Even Heathens (as Even Heathens)
2022: Unpleasant Never Dies (as Even Heathens)
2022: Odd Gods (as Even Heathens)

EP's 
2011: The E.P. (as Fat Killahz)
2011: Jesus Christ's Mistress
2012: Hail Dark Lord Vader
2016: Herojuana (with Bang Belushi)
2019: How to Gag a Maggot: Reigning Blood (as How to Gag a Maggot)
2019: House of HorrorS (as Murder Rap KingZ)
2020: The Purge (as How to Gag a Maggot)
2021: Foster Kidz (with Trilogy)
2021: Ladon (with Tres Aurland)
2021: Horrorcore Stories (as Even Heathens)
2021: The Infected (as How to Gag a Maggot)
2022: Tales from the Darkside (with Psychoetry)
2022: Morbid Clique vs. King Gordy (with Morbid Clique)

Mixtapes 
 2003: 2 Fat 2 Furious (as Fat Killahz)
 2017: Foul World (as L.A.R.S.)

Filmography 
8 Mile (2002) – Big O

Awards and nominations

References 

1977 births
Living people
Horrorcore artists
Underground rappers
American male actors
Rappers from Detroit
American shooting survivors
African-American male actors
21st-century American rappers
African-American male rappers
21st-century American male musicians
21st-century African-American musicians
20th-century African-American people